Gonzalo Nicolás Martínez, commonly known as Pity Martínez (born 13 June 1993) is an Argentine footballer who plays as an attacking midfielder for Saudi Professional League side Al-Nassr.

Club career

Huracán
Martínez, who trained in the Huracán youth system, debuted with Huracán's first team in the 2011–12 season. While at the club, he won his first Copa Argentina in 2014.

River Plate
Martínez joined River Plate in January 2015. Martínez made his club debut on 16 February 2015 against Club Atlético Sarmiento in a 1–4 away win. On 25 April 2015, his former team Huracán beat River Plate for the Supercopa Argentina title. In the Copa Libertadores, Martínez played in the quarter-final first leg match against Boca Juniors, a match River Plate would go on to win. Martínez won two more Copas Argentinas in a row, in 2016 and 2017. Martínez added two Recopa Sudamericanas, in 2015 and 2016. Martínez also won two Copas Libertadores, in 2015 and 2018, as well as one Suruga Bank Championship in 2015, in which he scored in River's 3–0 win over Gamba Osaka. He was instrumental in obtaining his first Supercopa Argentina title against Boca in 2017.

On 9 December 2018, Martínez scored his side's third goal to seal a 3–1 win, 5–3 aggregate victory, over Boca Juniors in the second leg of the Copa Libertadores held at Real Madrid's Bernabéu Stadium. Following the victory, he announced that he would be joining MLS side Atlanta United after the FIFA Club World Cup, as the club had met his $17 million release clause.

Atlanta United
On 24 January 2019, Martínez's transfer to Major League Soccer side Atlanta United was confirmed. On 12 May 2019, Martínez scored his first goal for Atlanta United during a 1–0 victory against Orlando City. He scored the game winner in the U.S. Open Cup final victory over Minnesota United on 27 August.

Al-Nassr
On 7 September 2020, Martínez joined Saudi Professional League side Al-Nassr for a reported transfer fee of $18 million.

International career
On 8 September 2018, Martínez made his Argentina national team debut in a 3–0 victory over Guatemala. He started the match, scored from the penalty spot after a handball by Elías Vásquez midway through the first half, and was replaced by Franco Vázquez in the 56th minute.

Career statistics

Club

International
Scores and results list Argentina's goal tally first.

Personal life
His nickname, Pity, refers to the wren ("pititorra"), from his native homeland of Guaymallén, in Mendoza, Argentina. He was given the nickname at the age of five, and does not respond to his given name, Gonzalo.

Honours
Huracán
 Copa Argentina: 2013–14

River Plate
 Copa Argentina: 2015–16, 2016–17
 Supercopa Argentina: 2017
 Copa Libertadores: 2015, 2018
 Recopa Sudamericana: 2015, 2016
 Suruga Bank Championship: 2015

Atlanta United
 U.S. Open Cup: 2019
 Campeones Cup: 2019

Al-Nassr
 Saudi Super Cup: 2020

Individual
 South American Footballer of the Year: 2018
 Copa Libertadores Best Player: 2018
 Footballer of the Year of Argentina: 2018
 MLS All-Star: 2019

References

1993 births
Living people
Sportspeople from Mendoza Province
Argentine people of indigenous peoples descent
Argentine expatriate footballers
Argentine footballers
Argentina international footballers
Association football midfielders
Argentine Primera División players
Major League Soccer players
Saudi Professional League players
Club Atlético Huracán footballers
Club Atlético River Plate footballers
Copa Libertadores-winning players
Atlanta United FC players
Al Nassr FC players
Argentine expatriate sportspeople in the United States
Expatriate soccer players in the United States
Argentine expatriate sportspeople in Saudi Arabia
Expatriate footballers in Saudi Arabia
Designated Players (MLS)